Amalia/Vinicius is a recording of the 1968 meeting between the Brazilian poet Vinicius de Moraes and the Portuguese singer Amália Rodrigues.  In December 1968, de Moraes was travelling to Rome, where he wanted to celebrate Christmas. However, before he arrived in Italy, the poet stayed some hours in Lisbon where he met Rodrigues at her home. The LP containing these conversations was released two years later.

At that event were present other Portuguese poets, like Ary dos Santos and Natália Correia. The meeting lasted hours, but the recording was edited down to only one hour. However, the tracks included in this album are considered relics of Brazilian and Portuguese poetry and music.

In 2001, the album was recorded on CD by EMI. In 2009, Biscoito Fino reissued the album on CD.

Track listing

Personnel

David Mourão Ferreira  – narration
Fontes Rocha  – guitar
Pedro Leal  – viola

References

Amália Rodrigues albums
1970 live albums
Portuguese-language live albums
EMI Records live albums
Vinicius de Moraes albums
Valentim de Carvalho albums